Shahla Humbatova has been an Azerbaijani human rights lawyer since 2013. After speaking out about prison conditions she found herself disbarred from being a lawyer. There were international protests and in 2020 she was recognised as an International Woman of Courage by the US Secretary of State, Mike Pompeo.

Life
She began practising law in Azarbaijan in 2013 where lawyers who are advocates in human rights cases can find themselves abused on-line and even disbarred, She is one of two women who are willing to champion such cases in her country's conservative culture. She has attracted criticism, and admiration, for defending LGBT clients. Her example is encouraging others to follow.

In 2019 she spoke publicly about the poor conditions of the political prisoner and journalist Mehman Huseynov. He was her client and she was later cautioned for spreading false information by the penitentiary service and the Azerbaijani Bar Association threatened proceedings. After this the prison refused to allow her access to her clients. The bar association attracted international criticism for moving to disbar Humbatova. Critics included the International Bar Association’s Human Rights Institute and Lawyers for lawyers. The bar association was asked to withdraw given the "arbitrary" nature of its charges.

She was given an award as an International Women of Courage on 4 March 2020 by the US Secretary of State. Earle D. Litzenberger the US ambassador returned to Washington to support her as she received the award. She was the first person from Azerbaijan to win the award. She noted afterwards that she had been rewarded in America for the same thing that she had been punished for in her own country.

References

Living people
21st-century Azerbaijani lawyers
Azerbaijani human rights activists
LGBT rights activists
Year of birth missing (living people)
Recipients of the International Women of Courage Award
21st-century women lawyers
Women civil rights activists